Henry Valerian George Wellesley, 6th Duke of Wellington (14 July 1912 – 16 September 1943), styled as Earl of Mornington between 1912 and 1934 and Marquess of Douro between 1934 and 1941, was a British peer and politician.

Life and career
He was the younger child and only son of Arthur Wellesley, 5th Duke of Wellington, and his wife, the Hon. Lilian Maud Glen Coats (elder daughter of George Coats, 1st Baron Glentanar). On 14 October 1933, he received a commission as a reserve second lieutenant in the Coldstream Guards, and he received a regular commission in the same rank in the Duke of Wellington's Regiment on 13 November 1935.

He died, aged 31, on 16 September 1943, during the Second World War, from wounds received in action while leading a group of Commandos. He is buried in the British Salerno War Cemetery, Bivio Pratole, in the province of Salerno, Italy. At the time of his death, he was a captain in command of a troop in No. 2 Commando, commanded by Lieutenant Colonel 'Mad' Jack Churchill.

Both No. 2 and 41 Commando were engaged at the Salerno landings, part of the Allied invasion of Italy. They switched from their initial battle area around Vietri sul Mare, west of Salerno, to a position two to three miles inland of Mercatello, then southeast of Salerno. The Germans held and were strengthening three high-ground positions. During the daytime of 16 September, No. 2 Commando moved back through a valley around the village of Piegolelle, dubbed 'Pigoletti', which had been cleared the night before, intending to capture a hill at the far end referred to as 'Pimple Hill'. However, in the early hours, the Germans had sent light forces back into the valley and also strengthened 'Pimple Hill'. On assaulting the hill two troops of commandos were exposed to well-positioned machine-gun fire. The Duke was among the fatalities: leading a charge against a machine-gun post he was hit by a sustained burst from an MG 42. His helmet was holed in three or four places.  He was buried close to the place where he was killed.  

As he died without issue and was the only son of his father, he was succeeded in the peerage by his uncle, Lord Gerald Wellesley. His sister Anne succeeded him as 7th Duchess of Ciudad Rodrigo.

References

External links

Duke of Wellington's Regiment – West Riding

1912 births
1943 deaths
Henry Wellesley, 6th Duke of Wellington
Dukes of Ciudad Rodrigo
Dukes of Wellington
Dukes da Vitória
Princes of Waterloo
Wellesley, Henry 6
Coldstream Guards officers
Duke of Wellington's Regiment officers
British Army personnel killed in World War II
British Army Commandos officers
Earls of Mornington